Vassar College is a private liberal arts college in Poughkeepsie, New York, United States. Founded in 1861 by Matthew Vassar, it was the second degree-granting institution of higher education for women in the United States, closely following Elmira College. It became coeducational in 1969 and now has a gender ratio at the national average. The college is one of the historic Seven Sisters, the first elite women's colleges in the U.S., and has a historic relationship with Yale University, which suggested a merger before they both became coeducational. 

As of 2021, of all those who apply to Vassar, approximately 19% are accepted for matriculation. Currently, there are close to 2,500 students attending the degree awarding institution. 

The college offers B.A. degrees in more than 50 majors, and features a flexible curriculum designed to promote a breadth of studies. Student groups at the college include theater and comedy organizations, a cappella groups, club sports teams, volunteer and service groups, and a circus troupe. Vassar College's varsity sports teams, known as the Brewers, play in the NCAA's Division III as members of the Liberty League.

A designated arboretum, the campus features more than 200 species of trees, a native plant preserve, and a  ecological preserve.

History

Vassar was founded as a women's school under the name Vassar Female College in 1861. Its first president was Milo P. Jewett, who had previously been first president of another women's school, Judson College; he led a staff of ten professors and twenty-one instructors.  But after only a year, its founder, Matthew Vassar, had the word Female cut from the name, prompting some residents of the town of Poughkeepsie, New York, to quip that its founder believed it might one day admit male students. The college became coeducational in 1969.

Vassar was the second of the Seven Sisters colleges, higher education schools that were formerly strictly for women, and historically sister institutions to the Ivy League. The first person appointed to the Vassar faculty was the astronomer Maria Mitchell, in 1865.

Vassar adopted coeducation in 1969. However, immediately following World War II, Vassar accepted a very small number of male students on the G.I. Bill. Because Vassar's charter prohibited male matriculants, the graduates were given diplomas via the University of the State of New York. These were reissued under the Vassar title after the school formally became co-educational. The formal decision to become co-ed came after its trustees declined an offer to merge with Yale University, its sibling institution, in the wave of mergers between the historically all-male colleges of the Ivy League and their Seven Sisters counterparts.

In its early years, Vassar was associated with the social elite of the Protestant establishment. E. Digby Baltzell writes that "upper-class WASP families educated their children at colleges such as Harvard, Princeton, Yale, and Vassar." A select and elite few of Vassar's students were allowed entry into the school's secret society Delta Sigma Rho, started in 1922. Before becoming President of the United States, Franklin Delano Roosevelt was a Trustee.

Roughly 2,450 students attend Vassar, and 98% live on campus. About 60% come from public high schools, and 40% come from private schools (both independent and religious). Vassar is currently 56% women and 44% men, at national average for national liberal arts colleges.  Students are taught by more than 336 faculty members, virtually all holding the doctorate degree or its equivalent. The student-faculty ratio is 8:1, average class size, 17.

In recent freshman classes, students of color constituted 32–38% of matriculants. International students from over 60 countries make up 8-10% of the student body.  In May 2007, in keeping with its commitment to diverse and equitable education, Vassar returned to a need-blind admissions policy wherein students are admitted by their academic and personal qualities, without regard to financial status.

Vassar president Frances D. Fergusson served for two decades. She retired in the spring of 2006, and was succeeded by Catharine Bond Hill, former provost at Williams College, who served for 10 years until she departed in 2016. Hill was replaced by Elizabeth Howe Bradley in 2017.

The college was listed as a census-designated place (Vassar College CDP) in 2019.

Presidents

Campus

Architecture

At the center of campus stands Main Building, one of the best examples of Second Empire architecture in the United States. When it was opened, Main Building was the largest building in the U.S. in terms of floor space. It formerly housed the entire college, including classrooms, dormitories, museum, library, and dining halls. The building was designed by Smithsonian architect James Renwick Jr. and was completed in 1865. It was preceded on campus by the original observatory. Both buildings are National Historic Landmarks. Rombout House was purchased by the college in 1915 and added to the National Register of Historic Places in 1982.

Many original brick buildings are scattered throughout the campus, but there are also several modern and contemporary structures of architectural interest. Ferry House, a student cooperative, was designed by Marcel Breuer in 1951. Noyes House was designed by Finnish-American architect Eero Saarinen. More recently, New Haven architect César Pelli was asked to design the Lehman Loeb Art Center, which was completed in the early 1990s. In 2003, Pelli also worked on the renovation of Main Building Lobby and the conversion of the Avery Hall theater into the $25 million Vogelstein Center for Drama and Film, which preserved the original 1860s facade but was an entirely new structure.

Libraries

Vassar is home to one of the largest undergraduate library collections in the U.S. The library collection today – which actually encompasses eight libraries at Vassar – contains about 1 million volumes and 7,500 serial, periodical and newspaper titles, as well as an extensive collection of microfilm and microfiche, with special collections of Ellen Swallow Richards, Albert Einstein, Mary McCarthy, and Elizabeth Bishop.  Vassar has been a Federal Depository library for selected U.S. Government documents since 1943 and currently receives approximately 25% of the titles available through the Federal Depository Program. Since 1988, Vassar has been a New York State Reference Center, part of the New York Depository Program. The library also selectively purchases United Nations documents.

A major renovation to Thompson Library was completed in 2001.

The interior and exterior of the Van Ingen Art Library was renovated from June 2008 – May 2009 in an effort to restore its original design and appearance. This was the library's first major renovation since its construction in 1937.

Frances Lehman Loeb Art Center

Vassar College was the first college in the United States to be founded with a full-scale museum as part of its original plan. Matthew Vassar was known for declaring that "art should stand boldly forth as an educational force". The art collection at Vassar dates to the founding of the college, when Vassar provided an extensive collection of Hudson River School paintings to be displayed in the Main Building.  Referred to as the Magoon Collection, it continues to be one of the best in the nation for Hudson River School paintings. One of the largest U.S. college or university art museums, the Frances Lehman Loeb Gallery displays a selection of Vassar's 18,000 articles of art in the building designed by Cesar Pelli.

Today, the gallery's collection displays art from the ancient world up through contemporary works. The collection includes work by European masters such as Brueghel, Gustave Doré, Picasso, Balthus, Bacon, Vuillard, Cézanne, Braque and Bonnard, as well as examples from leading twentieth-century American painters Jackson Pollock, Agnes Martin, Mark Rothko, Marsden Hartley, Georgia O'Keeffe, Charles Sheeler, and Ben Shahn.  The Loeb's works on paper represent a major collection in the United States, with prints by Rembrandt (including important impressions of the Hundred Guilder Print and the Three Trees) and Dürer as well as photographs by Cindy Sherman, Diane Arbus, and others. Students at the college can act as liaisons between the art center and the wider college community through work on the Student Committee of the Frances Lehman Loeb Art Center, to which incoming freshmen can apply.

In November 2016, the gallery opened the Hoene Hoy Photography gallery on the second floor, named after Anne Hoene Hoy from the class of 1963.

Capital improvements

In 2011, Vassar embarked on a $120 million project to improve science facilities at the college, centering on the construction of a new $90 million Bridge for Laboratory Sciences. The project included renovations of Olmsted Hall of Biological Sciences, New England Building and Sanders Physics Building as well as the construction of a new Integrated Science Center, a bridge building that connected to Olmsted Hall and crossed over the Fonteyn Kill. It was intended both to modernize and to support a collaborative and cross-disciplinary science community. The bridge building was completed in 2016.

Davison, one of Vassar's nine residence houses, was renovated during the 2008–2009 school year. During the year of renovation, Davison's residents were absorbed into the college's remaining residence houses. This was the second dorm to be renovated as part of the school's master plan to renovate all dorms, following Jewett a few years earlier. Lathrop was scheduled to be closed and renovated during the 2010–2011 school year, but complete renovation was postponed due to the economic downturn, with a number of improvements phased-in instead. Improvements were also made to Josselyn in 2011.

Academics

Vassar confers a Bachelor of Arts (BA) degree in more than 50 majors, including the independent major, in which a student may design a course of study, as well as various interdisciplinary and multidisciplinary fields of study. Students also participate in such programs as the self-instructional language program (SILP) which offers courses in Hindi, Irish/Gaelic, Korean, Portuguese, Swahili, Swedish, Turkish, and Yiddish. Vassar has a flexible curriculum intended to promote breadth in studies. While each field of study has specific requirements for majors, the only universal requirements for graduation are proficiency in a foreign language, a quantitative course, and a freshman writing course. 

Students are also encouraged to study abroad, which they typically do during one or two semesters of their junior year. Students (usually juniors) may apply for a year or a semester away either in the U.S. or abroad. Vassar sponsors programs in China, England, France, Germany, Greece, Ireland, Italy, Turkey, Mexico, Morocco, Spain, and Russia; students may also join pre-approved programs offered by other colleges. Students may also apply for approved programs at various U.S. institutions, including the historically Black colleges and members of the Twelve College Exchange.

All classes are taught by members of the faculty, and there are no graduate students or teachers' assistants. Vassar also offers a variety of correlate sequences, or minors, for intensive study in many disciplines.

The most popular undergraduate majors, based on 2021 graduates, were:
Biology/Biological Sciences (40)
Economics (37)
Political Science and Government (36)
English Language and Literature (33)
Biochemistry (25)
Neuroscience (25)
Computer and Information Sciences (23)

Admissions

For the class of 2026 (enrolling fall 2022), Vassar received 11.412 applications and accepted 18.7%. For the class of 2025 (enrolling fall 2021), Vassar received 10,884 applications, a 25% increase over the previous year, and accepted 2,068 (19%). For the class of 2023 (enrolling fall 2019), Vassar received 8,961 applications and accepted 2,127 (23.7%), with 691 enrolling.  For the class of 2025 (enrolling fall 2021),the middle 50% range of SAT scores for enrolling freshmen was 710-760 for evidence-based reading and writing, 710-780 for math, and 1420-1540 for the composite. The middle 50% ACT score range was 28-33 for math, 32-34 for English, and 32-34 for the composite.

Students of color (including non-citizens) made up 45.5% of the incoming class; international students were 8.8% of enrolling freshmen.

Rankings

The 2023 edition of U.S. News & World Reports "Best Colleges" ranked Vassar as the 13th best liberal arts college in the U.S. out of 223 rated. In previous years the college was ranked by U.S. News & World Report as high as tenth. Also in 2023, U.S. News & World Report ranked Vassar second for "Best Colleges for Veterans", 31st for "Best Value", tied at 20th for "Top Performers on Social Mobility", and 31st in "Best Undergraduate Teaching".  It also ranked Vassar tied for second among top liberal arts colleges for economic diversity as measured by low-income students receiving federal Pell Grants.

In its 2021 edition, Washington Monthly ranked Vassar 11th among 215 liberal arts colleges in the U.S. based on its contribution to the public good, as measured by social mobility, research, and promoting public service.

In its 2020 edition, The Princeton Review rated Vassar first for "Best Financial Aid" of all colleges and universities in the United States. In its 2018 edition, The Princeton Review rated Vassar second best for financial aid and 41st best for "best value".  In 2019, Forbes rated Vassar 27th among liberal arts colleges and 61st overall in its America's Top Colleges ranking, which includes 650 military academies, national universities, and liberal arts colleges. Kiplinger's Personal Finance places Vassar 11th in its 2019 ranking of the 149 best value liberal arts colleges in the United States. Money magazine ranked Vassar 145th in the country out of 739 schools evaluated for its 2020 "Best Colleges for Your Money" edition.

In an article in The Christian Science Monitor, Vassar president emeritus Catharine Bond Hill argued that rankings "will always be limited in what they can tell consumers. Part of higher education's role about the rankings should be to remind students and their families that these are only one piece of information that they should take into account in deciding where to go to college. Intangibles will and should play a role in these decisions, but that doesn't mean we shouldn't also look at the tangibles".

Post-graduation outcomes
Over half of Vassar graduates pursue advanced study within five years of graduation, including one-fifth immediately post-graduation. Of the seniors who applied to medical school in 2017, 76% were accepted; to law school, 96% were accepted.  Vassar offers a database of well over 30,000 alumni where students may seek career advice and opportunities. Numerous graduates of the college have earned distinction in their fields, garnering Academy, Emmy, Tony, Peabody and Golden Globe awards for work on stage and in film and television, MacArthur Fellowships ("genius grants") for innovation in fields including astrophysics, epidemiology, and medicine, Pulitzer Prize recognition for contributions to American literature, poetry, history, and investigative reporting, as well as the Presidential Medal of Freedom and National Medal of Science for achievements in astronomy, computer science, and drama.

Student life

Traditions

Founder's Day is an annual campus festival at Vassar College that usually takes place in late April or early May. It started as a surprise birthday party for college founder Matthew Vassar's seventy-fourth birthday and evolved into an annual celebration. Originally, Founder's Day was a spontaneous event consisting of lectures, but was soon replaced with plays, pageants, and more recreational activities. Circus and fair activities followed, with the eventual addition of the modern day music events over the course of two days. More recently themes have been added, including Alice in Wonderland, Dinosaurs, Vintage 1800s Vassar, Nickelodeon, Nintendo, and Candyland. Recent artists at Founder's Day have included The Walkmen, Edan, DJ /rupture, Odd Nosdam, Jel, Toro y Moi, and Odesza.

Extracurricular organizations

 The Night Owls, established in the 1940s, are, as of 2017, one of the oldest extant collegiate a cappella groups in the United States, and one of nine vocal music groups at Vassar. Other groups include the Vastards (specializing in the music of the 2000s), Broadway and More (BAM; showtunes), the Accidentals (the Axies; the sole all-men's a cappella group at Vassar), Beauty and the Beats (focusing on music from Disney movies), Home Brewed (formerly Matthew's Minstrels, the college's first mixed-gender a cappella group), the Vassar Devils, Measure 4 Measure (both themeless groups), and AirCappella (an all-whistling ensemble). Some a cappella groups tour and compete, including the Vassar Devils, who competed in the 2015 International Championship of Collegiate A Cappella.
 The Philaletheis Society, which was founded in 1865 as a literary society, is the oldest theater group on campus. It has now become a completely student run theater group. Others include Unbound (experimental theater), Woodshed (a troupe focused on devised theater), and Idlewild (an all-female ensemble). Britomartis, Vassar's only theater group exclusively creating devised theater, was founded in 2011. Further groups include the Future Waitstaff of America (for musical theater), Ebony Theatre Ensemble (focusing on Black theater), and two Shakespeare-specific troupes, Shakespeare Troupe and Merely Players. Performances happen throughout campus including in the Susan Stein Shiva Theater, an all-student-run black box theater. The college also hosts the Powerhouse Summer Theater workshop series.
 Happily Ever Laughter ("HEL") is the college's oldest continually active sketch comedy group, founded in 1993. Another comedy group, Big K1dz (formerly No Offense), which was started by two former members of an earlier group called Laughingstock (for which recognition by the student assembly was withdrawn in March 2000, as a result of a controversial sketch), was started in September 2000.  Another sketch comedy group The Limit was started a few years later. Indecent Exposure, an all-women's troupe performing both sketch and stand-up comedy, was founded in 2004. Comedynormative, which began in 2009, performs exclusively stand-up comedy. Vassar has three improv comedy groups: Vassar College Vassar Improv (VCVI), Committed, and Casual Improv.
 The Vassar Greens are Vassar's environmental group. This group strives to create real and lasting change on campus and in the greater Poughkeepsie community through initiatives like banning bottled water, on campus composting, and encourage local policy makers to adopt more sustainable waste management practices. Recently, the group opened the 'Free Market' on campus. This a store that students can donate to and take from freely to promote recycling and reduce waste.
 Vassar College Television (VCTV) is the college's first student-run video production company. Students collaborate to develop, write, produce, direct, edit, and act in video productions, including an annual web series. These productions cover a variety of genres, including drama and comedy.

Campus publications

 The Miscellany News has been the weekly paper of the college since 1866, making it one of the oldest college weeklies in the United States. It is available for free most Thursdays when school is in session. In 2008–09, it became one of the only college newspapers in the country to begin updating its website daily.
 The Vassar Chronicle is the college's only political journal, which seeks to expand the breadth of political dialogue on campus by publishing long-form opinion columns. The Chronicle is the revivification of a student publication that appeared from 1944 to 1959 and during the 1970s; the modern-day Chronicle has been published monthly since 2010 and currently has a 1,000-copy circulation.
 The Vassar Student Review is an annual literary and art magazine featuring works (fiction, creative non-fiction, poetry, artwork, photography, essays, etc.) by Vassar students. It is the oldest student-run literary publication in the college's history. Its purpose is to serve the needs and expand the creative voice of Vassar's literary and art community. The VSR also orchestrates events and activities garnered towards the enrichment of Vassar's writers community. Some past events have included regularly-scheduled writing workshops and writer's nights in the cafe, as well as the sponsorship of various relevant speakers brought by other organizations.
 Squirm "is a submissions-based magazine about sex and sexuality. Squirm seeks to create a sex-positive forum on campus for the artistic, literary, and creative exploration of sex." The magazine, published annually since 1999, typically runs around 60 pages and is only distributed to the campus community.
 Contrast is the college's art and style magazine. It is published each semester.
 Boilerplate Magazine is a student-run publication that calls itself an "alternative news source... that aims to publish radical pieces and creative works which address issues through a socially conscious lens." Due to its independence from collegiate funds, Boilerplate Magazine is generally more critical of the college than other student-run outlets.
 Unscrewed (1 October 1976 - 1 April 1989) was a student-run consumer report on campus residential and classroom safety, local food and drug price comparison, an annual local pizza delivery survey, and long-term topics such as the college's endowment and staffing.

Radio station
WVKR, 91.3 FM, is the college's radio station, established in 1971. The station's disc jockeys, primarily student volunteers, play an eclectic variety of music genres.

Student government
In March 2016, in a 15–2 vote, the Vassar Student Association (VSA) passed a resolution calling for the support of the Boycott, Divestment and Sanctions movement and the boycott of Israel. In April 2016, the BDS resolution went to a school-wide referendum, where it was defeated 573–503.

Athletics

Vassar teams, known as the Brewers, compete in Division III of the NCAA, as a member of the Liberty League. The nickname originates from the college's founder and namesake Matthew Vassar, whose family ran a brewery in Poughkeepsie and would later amass a sizable fortune in the industry.

Vassar College currently offers the following varsity athletics: basketball, baseball, cross-country, fencing (competes in the Northeast Fencing Conference), field hockey (women only), golf (women only), lacrosse, rowing, rugby, soccer, squash, swimming/diving, tennis, track, and volleyball. Club sports include ultimate (open, mixed, and women's), ski team (competes in USCSA), equestrian team (competes in IHSA), polo team (USPA), cycling team (competes in ECCC), quidditch, and co-ed U.S. Figure Skating synchronized skating team.

Basketball teams play in Vassar's new Athletics and Fitness Center. Volleyball teams play in Kenyon Hall, reopened in 2006. Soccer, baseball, field hockey and lacrosse teams play at Prentiss Fields, which have been completely renovated in 2007 to feature a lighted turf, four grass fields, a baseball field and a track surrounding the turf. Also in 2007, a varsity weight room was opened in the basement of Kenyon Hall, exclusively for the training of varsity athletes.

In 2008, the Vassar men's volleyball team made the school's first appearance in a national championship game, beating UC Santa Cruz 3–0 in the semifinal before falling to Springfield in the championship game.

In 2007, the Vassar cycling team hosted the Eastern Collegiate Cycling Championship in Poughkeepsie and New Paltz, New York. The competition included a  road race over the Shawangunk Mountains in New Paltz as well as a criterium in Poughkeepsie just blocks from the school's campus.

In a controversial move, on November 5, 2009, the athletics department leaders decided the men's and women's rowing team would transition over a two-year period from a varsity to a club sport as a cost-saving measure.

In 1940, 1941 and 1942, Vassar athletes won national intercollegiate women's tennis championships each year in both singles (Katharine Hubbell) and doubles (Hubbell, Carolyn "Lonny" Myers).

In 2018, the Vassar women's rugby team won the school's first team national championship, beating Winona State 50–13 in the final of the USA Rugby Women's Division 2.

Notable people

Notable Vassar alumni include:

 Elizabeth Hazleton Haight (1894), notable feminist and Classics scholar
 Anita Florence Hemmings (1897), their first graduate of African ancestry
 Edith Clarke (1908), the first female Electrical Engineer
 Mary Ingraham (1908), founder of the United Service Organizations (USO)
 Ruth Starr Rose (1910), artist
 Edna St. Vincent Millay (1917), poet
 Mary Calderone (1925), physician, public health advocate and "mother of sex education"
 Grace Hopper (1928), computer pioneer
 Mary McCarthy (1933), critic and novelist
 Elizabeth Bishop (1934), poet
Carol F. Jopling (1938), anthropologist, Librarian, and chief librarian of the Smithsonian Tropical Research Institute
 Frances Scott Fitzgerald (1942), writer and journalist
 Beatrix Hamburg (1944), physician
 Virginia Seay (1944), composer and musicologist
 Frances Farenthold (1946), politician and activist
 Vera Rubin (1948), astrophysicist
 Linda Nochlin (1951), Art Historian
 Lois Haibt (1955), member of FORTRAN development team
 Nina Zagat (1963), Zagat Survey co-founder
 Bernadine P. Healy (1965), physician and National Institutes of Health director
 Lucinda Cisler (1965), feminist and abortion rights activist
 Geraldine Laybourne (1969), Nickelodeon President and Oxygen Media founder and CEO
 Linda Fairstein (1969), author and prosecutor
 Rebecca Eaton (1969), Emmy award-winning executive producer of Masterpiece on PBS
 Meryl Streep (1971), three-time Academy Award winner actress
 Jane Smiley (1971), Pulitzer Prize-winning fiction writer
 Michael Wolff (1975), author and journalist
 Richard L. Huganir (1975), Neuroscientist and Director of Johns Hopkins Medicine Brain Science Institute
 Chip Reid (1977), CBS News Chief White House Correspondent
 Jeffrey Goldstein (1977), former World Bank CFO and Undersecretary of the Treasury for Domestic Finance
 Michael Specter (1977), The New Yorker magazine science writer
 Jamshed Bharucha (1978), Cooper Union President
 Phil Griffin (1979), MSNBC President
 John Carlstrom (1981), astrophysicist and MacArthur Award Fellow
 Pamela Mars-Wright, (1982), former board chairman of Mars Inc.
 Philip Jefferson (1983), economist and Federal Reserve Board Governor
 Mark Burstein (1984), President of Lawrence University of Wisconsin
 Ada Ferrer (1984), Pulitzer Prize-winning historian
 Sherrilyn Ifill (1984), Seventh President and Director-Counsel of the NAACP Legal Defense and Educational Fund
 Lisa Kudrow (1985), actress
 Hope Davis (1986), actress
 Evan Wright (1988),  journalist
 Jonathan Karl (1990), ABC News Chief White House Correspondent
 Jeffrey Brenner (1990), physician and MacArthur Award Fellow
 John Gatins (1990), Oscar-nominated Screenwriter 
 Noah Baumbach (1991), writer-director
 Jason Blum (1991), Emmy-winning and Oscar-nominated film and television producer
 Caterina Fake (1991), Flickr founder
 Elisabeth Murdoch (1992), Shine Limited CEO and Chairman
 Jon Fisher (1994), author
 Katherine Center (1994), novelist
 Joe Hill (1995), novelist
 Jessi Klein (1997), Emmy Award-winning comedy writer-producer
 Jesse Ball (2000), writer
 Alexandra Berzon (2001), Pulitzer Prize-winning journalist and Wall Street Journal reporter
 Shaka King (2001), film director, screenwriter, and producer
 Victoria Legrand (2003), musician and songwriter
 Jonás Cuarón (2005), screenwriter and director
 Sasha Velour (2009), winner of RuPaul's Drag Race Season 9
 Lilli Cooper (2012), Tony Award-nominated actress
 Ethan Slater (2014), Tony Award-nominated actor
 Raph Korine (2017), and runner-up of Big Brother 18 (UK)

Notable attendees who did not graduate from Vassar include:
 Julia Tutwiler, notable education and prison reform advocate
 Anthony Bourdain, professional chef and television personality
 Jacqueline Kennedy Onassis, First Lady of the United States
 Katharine Graham, Washington Post publisher
 Susan Berresford, president of the Ford Foundation
 Anne Hathaway,  actress
 Jane Fonda, actress
 Justin Long, actor
 Mike D, member of the Beastie Boys
 Mark Ronson, Oscar-winning musician
 Rachael Yamagata, musician
 Curtis Sittenfeld, writer

Notable Vassar faculty include:
 Maria Mitchell, pioneering female astronomer
 Grace Hopper, computer scientist
 Monique Wittig, philosopher
 Grace Macurdy, classicist
 Richard Edward Wilson, composer
 Uma Narayan, philosopher
 Mitchell Miller, philosopher
 Bryan W. Van Norden, philosopher
 James Merrell, historian
 Peter Stillman, political scientist
 Paul Russell, writer
 Hua Hsu, writer
 Nancy Willard, writer
 Frank Bergon, writer
 Michael Joyce, writer and pioneer of hypertext fiction

Gallery

References

Further reading

External links

 
 Vassar Athletics website
 

 
1861 establishments in New York (state)
Educational institutions established in 1861
Former women's universities and colleges in the United States
Seven Sister Colleges
Universities and colleges in Dutchess County, New York
Private universities and colleges in New York (state)
Tourist attractions in Poughkeepsie, New York
Liberal arts colleges in New York (state)